Mohr (also Romanized as Mehr; also known as Mohur, Mūr, and Mohur-i- Saiyidān) is a city and capital of Mohr County, in Fars Province, Iran.  At the 2006 census, its population was 6,188, in 1,316 families.  Its main industries are based on its rich gas sources. Tabnak, Homa, Shanol, Varavi are important Gas Zones in this region. It has a dry hot climate.

References

Populated places in Mohr County

Cities in Fars Province